Cathryn Antoinette "Toni" Tennille (born May 8, 1940) is an American singer-songwriter and keyboardist, best known as one-half of the 1970s duo Captain & Tennille with her former husband Daryl Dragon; their signature song is "Love Will Keep Us Together".
Tennille also did musical work independently of Dragon, including solo albums and session work.

Early life 
Tennille was born and raised in Montgomery, Alabama, and has three younger sisters. Her father Frank owned a furniture store and also served in the Alabama Legislature from 1951 to 1954. He had been a singer with Bob Crosby's Bob-Cats. For five years, her mother, also named Cathryn (née Wright), hosted a daily television show in Montgomery.

Tennille graduated from Sidney Lanier High School and then for two years attended Auburn University in Alabama, where she studied classical piano and sang with a local big band, the Auburn Knights.

In 1959, after her father's furniture store failed, Tennille's family moved from Montgomery to Balboa, California, where she worked first as a file clerk and then as a statistical analyst for North American Rockwell Corporation.

Career

While living in Corona del Mar in Newport Beach, California, during the late 1960s, Tennille was a member of the South Coast Repertory. Ron Thronsen, one of the directors of the repertory, asked Tennille in 1969 to write the music for a new rock musical he was working on called Mother Earth. The musical was a success locally, went on the road to San Francisco and Los Angeles in 1971, and eventually made it to Broadway for a few dates at the Belasco Theatre in October 1972. Although Tennille was no longer associated with the musical by the time it reached Broadway, she was credited as the composer under her married name, Shearer.

In 1971, Tennille met her future husband Daryl Dragon in San Francisco during auditions for Mother Earth. Dragon had previously toured with the Beach Boys and had recorded with them as a studio musician. After Mother Earth ended, Dragon returned to the Beach Boys and introduced Tennille to the band. Tennille played electric piano with the band during their 1972 tour. In 1973, Tennille and Dragon left to form Captain & Tennille and began performing at local clubs. In September 1973, they released their self-financed debut single, "The Way I Want to Touch You", which was a local hit and helped them to get a record contract with A&M Records. The duo recorded a cover version of the Neil Sedaka and Howard Greenfield song "Love Will Keep Us Together" in 1975 that became a huge success and eventually went on to win the 1975 Grammy Award for Record of the Year.

In 1974, Tennille sang background vocals on Elton John's Caribou album.

In 1979, she sang backing vocals on Pink Floyd's The Wall.

On July 8, 1980, Tennille sang the national anthem at the Major League Baseball All-Star game at Dodger Stadium in Los Angeles.

Following a December 1979 pilot, from September 1980 to February 1981 Tennille hosted her own syndicated television talk show, The Toni Tennille Show.

From September 1998 to June 1999, Tennille performed as "Victoria Grant/Count Victor Grazinski" in the national tour of the play Victor Victoria.

With her then-husband Daryl Dragon, as Captain & Tennille, she recorded the Christmas song "Saving Up Christmas" included in their DVD box set for 1976-1977's The Captain & Tennille Show; this was followed by a full-length Christmas album titled The Secret of Christmas, released in 2007.

In April 2016, Tennille released her memoir, Toni Tennille: A Memoir, and went on a book tour to promote it later that summer. An audiobook of the memoir was also released on the audiobook service Audible.

Personal life 

Tennille married her first husband, former drummer Kenneth Shearer, in June 1962 at the age of 22. They divorced in late 1972. The divorce was civil and they remained on amicable terms.  She then married Daryl Dragon on February 14, 1974. Tennille stated that their accountant told them they would do "a lot better with taxes" if they were married. The couple moved from Reno, Nevada, to Prescott, Arizona, in 2007. They divorced in July 2014.

In 2015, Tennille moved to Florida at the suggestion of her sister Jane. During the promotion of her autobiography on The Today Show in the spring of 2016, Tennille said the reason for their divorce was Dragon's "inability to be affectionate". In her memoir Tennille revealed that despite their success and public image of a solid marriage, she was lonely and isolated. Dragon had been controlling and emotionally distant; throughout their relationship they slept in separate bedrooms. "I can say without exaggeration that he showed no physical affection for me during our very long marriage," she said. She reported that Dragon reacted positively to her memoir and the revelation by saying, "I saw you on The Today Show. I was proud of you."

Despite their divorce, Tennille and Dragon remained friends until his death from kidney failure on January 2, 2019. Dragon stated in a February 2017 interview with People that Tennille had returned to Arizona to assist him following a serious health-related incident he had experienced the previous year.

Discography

Studio albums
 More Than You Know (1984)
 All of Me (1987)
 Do It Again (1988) 
 Never Let Me Go (1991)
 Things Are Swingin''' (1994)<ref>{{cite news|last=Giuliano|first=Mike|url=http://articles.baltimoresun.com/1994-05-17/features/1994137014_1_toni-tennille-captain-tennille-muskrat-love|title=Now Tennille looks to big-band era for love songs|date=May 17, 1994|newspaper=The Baltimore Sun|quote=With several big band albums to her credit, including the just-released 'Things Are Swingin (...)|access-date=October 22, 2016}}</ref>
 Incurably Romantic (2001)

References

Bibliography

External links

1940 births
21st-century American keyboardists
Living people
Sidney Lanier High School alumni
Age controversies
American contraltos
American women singer-songwriters
American session musicians
Musicians from Montgomery, Alabama
Grammy Award winners
Auburn University alumni
American rock keyboardists
A&M Records artists
Casablanca Records artists
American women pop singers
20th-century American keyboardists
20th-century American women musicians
21st-century American women
Singer-songwriters from Alabama